Kudoa paraquadricornis is a  myxosporean parasite of marine fishes, first discovered in Australia from 4 carangid species.

References

Further reading
Miller, T. L., and R. D. Adlard. "Unicapsula species (Myxosporea: Trilosporidae) of Australian marine fishes, including the description of Unicapsula andersenae n. sp. in five teleost families off Queensland, Australia." Parasitology research 112.8 (2013): 2945-2957.
Yokoyama, H., T. Yanagida, and S. Shirakashi. "Kudoa ogawai n. sp.(Myxozoa: Multivalvulida) from the trunk muscle of Pacific barrelfish Hyperoglyphe japonica (Teleostei: Centrolophidae) in Japan." Parasitology research 110.6 (2012): 2247-2254.
Mansour, Lamjed, et al. "Kudoa azevedoi n. sp.(Myxozoa, Multivalvulida) from the oocytes of the Atlantic horse mackerel Trachurus trachurus (Perciformes, Carangidae) in Tunisian coasts." Parasitology research 112.4 (2013): 1737-1747.

External links

Kudoidae
Animal parasites of fish
Veterinary parasitology
Animals described in 2009